Pseudochlorella signiensis is a species of green algae in the family Koliellaceae. Pabia signiensis, the only species in the genus Pabia, is regarded as a synonym. Pabia was sunk into Pseudochlorella in 2016.

References

Prasiolales